Marcia Anne Prestlien (née Henderson; July 22, 1929 – November 23, 1987) was an American actress. She made her Broadway debut as Wendy in the musical Peter Pan (1950), for which she won a Theatre World Award. Henderson also appeared in films such as All I Desire (1953), The Glass Web (1953), Canyon River (1956), and The Wayward Girl (1957).

Early years
Born in Andover, Massachusetts, and raised in Williamstown, Massachusetts, Henderson was the daughter of Mr. and Mrs. John D. Henderson. She graduated from Williamstown High School in 1947 and from the American Academy of Dramatic Arts in 1949. Her high school activities included cheerleading and playing basketball and soccer. She also was editor of the school's newspaper and wrote articles for two professional newspapers in her area.

Stage
Henderson played Wendy in the 1950 Broadway musical version of Peter Pan, which starred Jean Arthur as Peter Pan and is a different adaption of the story than the one made famous four years later starring Mary Martin. Her co-star was Boris Karloff in the dual roles of George Darling and Captain Hook. Reviewers at The New York Times and the New York Herald Tribune praised her performance, for which she won a 1949–50 Theatre World Award.  The show ran for 321 performances, closing on January 27, 1951.

She had the lead in the touring company of The Moon Is Blue. She performed in the first play of the Williamstown Theatre Festival in 1955.

Television
Henderson's first regular role on TV was playing Kathleen Anderson on The Aldrich Family. In 1951, she co-starred in Two Girls Named Smith, a 30-minute program broadcast on Saturdays on ABC. She co-starred with Peter Lawford in Dear Phoebe, a situation comedy on NBC in 1954–1955. Henderson had a lead guest role in a 1958 episode of The Restless Gun, with John Payne in the title role.

In 1959 she appeared on TV, with Gene Barry in Bat Masterson and with Steve McQueen in an episode of Wanted Dead or Alive called "The Hostage.".

Film
Henderson had featured roles in the 1953 dramas Thunder Bay starring James Stewart and All I Desire starring Barbara Stanwyck. She then had co-star billing in Back to God's Country, opposite Rock Hudson, and The Glass Web with Edward G. Robinson that same year.

In 1954, she was one of the stars of the drama Naked Alibi along with Sterling Hayden, then two years later in a western, Canyon River. One of her final films, 1962's Deadly Duo, featured Henderson playing dual roles as twins.

Personal life
Henderson married medical student Robert Brodsky October 15, 1950, in New York City. They divorced in December 1953. In 1961, she married actor Robert Ivers. They had two daughters, Alenda and Mallory.

Beginning in 1957, Henderson suffered from rheumatoid arthritis, "which severely limited and eventually ended her promising acting career" in the 1960s. She was later diagnosed with lupus, an autoimmune disease.

Death
Henderson died on November 23, 1987 in Yakima, Washington, aged 58.

Filmography

Radio appearances

References

External links

1929 births
1987 deaths
American stage actresses
American film actresses
American television actresses
People from Andover, Massachusetts
Actresses from Massachusetts
20th-century American actresses